Dehne is a German surname. Notable people with the surname include:

Frank Dehne (born 1976), German volleyball player
Miriam Dehne (born 1968), German film director, screenwriter and author

See also 
 Dehn (disambiguation)
 Dəhnə (disambiguation)

German-language surnames